Qibao (Shanghainese: Tshih4pau2) is a town in Minhang District, Shanghai. Its formation can be traced back to the Five Dynasties and Ten Kingdoms period, to the Northern Song Dynasty. The name comes from the local temple, "Qibao Temple". Today, Qibao is a tourist attraction, in the area known as Qibao Old Town by the Puhui River with traditional Chinese architecture and a number of attractions, including museums and street food. 

The town was also once the residence of the noted painter Zhang Chongren, a friend of the Belgian cartoonist Hergé, on whom the character Chang Chong-Chen from "The Adventures of Tintin" was based.
Qibao is also known for crickets (with a "Cricket House") in the Qibao Old Town area.

Location
It can be accessed by taking Shanghai Metro Line 9 to Qibao Station. , it has 54 residential communities and nine villages under its administration.

See also 
 List of twin towns and sister cities in China
 Qibao Old Town
 Qibao station (Shanghai Metro)

References

Towns in Shanghai
Minhang District